is a well-known 1914 Japanese children's song, with music by Teiichi Okano and lyrics by Tatsuyuki Takano.

Although Takano's hometown was Nakano, Nagano, his lyrics do not seem to refer to a particular place. Instead, they describe a person who is working in a distant land, expressing his feelings of nostalgia for the hills and fields of his childhood home.

The Japanese government has designated Furusato as a Japanese children's song to be taught in the Japanese public school system, and the song has also been included in the recent popular song collection known as Nihon no Uta Hyakusen.

The composer and the writer of the song were unknown until the 1970s. Since 1992, however, the names of both Teiichi Okano and Tatsuyuki Takano have been printed with the song in Japanese music textbooks.

At the closing ceremony of the 1998 Winter Olympics in Nagano, the song was played, and in 2014, in commemoration of the 100th anniversary of Furusato, the song was performed by children's chorus with orchestral accompaniment at the Saito Kinen Festival Matsumoto in Nagano, under the direction of Seiji Ozawa.

Placido Domingo, one of The Three Tenors, sang the song in Japanese at his concert that held in NHK hall on April 10, 2011.

Lyrics

English version
The song was translated into English by Greg Irwin and this was published in the album called "Japan's Best Loved Songs of the Season" in 1998. This version was also performed by Lexi Walker. 
 
My Country Home by Greg Irwin

Back in the mountains I knew as a child

Fish filled the rivers and rabbits ran wild

Memories, I carry these wherever I may roam

I hear it calling me, my country home

Mother and Fathers, how I miss you now

How are my friends I lost touch with somehow?

When the rain falls or the wind blows I feel so alone

I hear it calling me, my country home

I've got this dream and it keeps me away

When it comes true I'm going back there someday

Crystal waters, mighty mountains blue as emerald stone

I hear it calling me, my country home

References

Japanese songs
Japanese children's songs
1914 songs